The deserts of Australia or the Australian deserts cover about , or 18% of the Australian mainland, but about 35% of the Australian continent receives so little rain, it is practically desert. Collectively known as the Great Australian desert, they are primarily distributed throughout the Western Plateau and interior lowlands of the country, covering areas from South West Queensland, Far West region of New South Wales, Sunraysia in Victoria and Spencer Gulf in South Australia to the Barkly Tableland in Northern Territory and the Kimberley region in Western Australia. 

The deserts in the interior and south lack any significant summer rains. The desert in western Australia is well explained by the little evaporation of the cold sea current of the West Australian Current, of polar origin, which prevents significant rainfall in the interior of the continent. About 40% of Australia is covered by dunes. Australia is the driest inhabited continent, with the least fertile soils. 

In addition to being mostly uninhabited, the Great Australian Desert is diverse, where it consists of semi-desert grassy or mountainous landscapes, xeric shrubs, salt pans, gibber (stony) deserts, red sand dunes, sandstone mesas, rocky plains, open tree savannahs and bushland with a few rivers and salt lakes, which are mostly seasonally dry and often have no outflow in the east. The 3 million km² desert is among the least modified in the world. The Australian desert has the largest population of feral camels in the world.

History

Geological

The area's geology spans a geological time period of over 3.8 billion years, therefore featuring some of the oldest rocks on earth. There are three main cratonic shields of recognised Archaean age within the Australian landmass: The Yilgarn, the Pilbara and the Gawler cratons. Several other Archaean-Proterozoic orogenic belts exist, usually sandwiched around the edges of these major cratonic shields. The history of the Archaean cratons is extremely complex and protracted. The cratons appear to have been accumulated to form the greater Australian landmass in the late Archaean to meso-Proterozoic, (~2400 Ma to 1,600 Ma).

Chiefly the Capricorn Orogeny is partly responsible for the assembly of the West Australian landmass by connecting the Yilgarn and Pilbara cratons. The Capricorn Orogeny is exposed in the rocks of the Bangemall Basin, Gascoyne Complex granite-gneisses and the Glengarry, Yerrida and Padbury basins. Unknown Proterozoic orogenic belts, possibly similar to the Albany Complex in southern Western Australia and the Musgrave Block, represent the Proterozoic link between the Yilgarn and Gawler cratons, covered by the Proterozoic-Palaeozoic Officer and Amadeus basins.

Aboriginal

Indigenous Australians have lived in the desert for at least 50,000 years and occupied all Outback regions, including the driest deserts, when Europeans first entered central Australia in the 1800s. Many Indigenous Australians retain strong physical and cultural links to their traditional country and are legally recognised as the traditional owners of large parts of the Outback under Commonwealth Native Title legislation.

Aboriginal tribes and clans have been nomadic in the desert areas for thousands of years. They subsisted on the local flora and fauna, now known as bush food, and made sure that their sources of drinking water remained intact. The nomads moved in clearly demarcated tribal areas. For example, important tribes living in the desert areas include the Arrernte, Luritja and Pitjantjatjara. The latter tribe's sphere of influence extended from Uluṟu to the Nullarbor Plain. The Dieri tribe lives in a large area of the Simpson, Strzelecki and Tirari deserts. 

The rock art and archaeological site at Karnatukul was, until recently, estimated to have been inhabited for up to 25,000 years, and known as the site of the oldest continuous recorded occupation in the Western Desert cultural region. Karnakatul shows one of the earliest uses of firewood, and habitation continued through times of extreme climate change, when the desertification occurred as the polar ice sheets expanded. The oldest examples of rock art, in Western Australia's Pilbara region and the Olary district of South Australia, are estimated to be up to around 40,000 years old. The oldest firmly dated evidence of rock art painting in Australia is a charcoal drawing on a small rock fragment found during the excavation of the Narwala Gabarnmang rock shelter in south-western Arnhem Land in the Northern Territory.

The isolated desert areas remained undeveloped for a long time. For example, the Spinifex People first had contact with whites in the 1950s, when they were expelled from their tribal lands because of nuclear weapons testing (1950–1963) by the British and Australian governments. The Pintupi Nine, a group of nine Aboriginal people of the Pintupi tribe, lived in the Stone Age area of the Gibson Desert until October 1984, when they first encountered whites as they left the desert. Both discoveries were sensations at the time.

Large parts of the Australian desert areas are part of the Desert Cultural Area. For Aboriginal people, the Uluṟu in the desert area and the Kata Tjuṯa with their Dreamtime stories have great cultural significance. Aboriginal Australians of the desert produced many important artists, one of the first and most famous being Albert Namatjira, who was born in Hermannsburg in the Great Sandy Desert. About a third of Australia's deserts are now Aboriginal lands. A very large part of it is managed by them as a nature reserve. A number of tribes have land use rights for almost all other desert regions. Today, numerous Aboriginal peoples live in settlements in the deserts.

European

The Strzelecki Desert was named in 1845 by explorer Charles Sturt after Polish explorer Paul Edmund Strzelecki.

The first European to cross the Great Sandy Desert was Peter Egerton Warburton. He arrived on the Western Australian coast badly exhausted and blind in one eye. He owed his survival to Charley, an Aboriginal tracker. The British explorer Ernest Giles, who crossed the desert in 1875, gave it the name Great Victoria Desert. It is dedicated to Queen Victoria. From 1858 onwards, the so-called "Afghan" cameleers and their beasts played an instrumental role in opening up the Outback and helping to build infrastructure.

The Sturt Stony Desert was named by Charles Sturt in 1844, while he was trying to find the inland sea which he believed lay at the centre of Australia. In 1866 Peter Egerton Warburton's expedition reached the Tirari desert from the west. The Overland Telegraph line was constructed in the 1870s along the route identified by Stuart. In 1865 the surveyor George Goyder, using changes in vegetation patterns, mapped a line in South Australia, north of which he considered rainfall to be too unreliable to support agriculture. British explorer Ernest Giles named the Gibson Desert in memory of Alfred Gibson, who went missing during an 1873–74 expedition. 

The Tanami Desert was named by explorer and prospector Allan Davidson. He only assigned the name on his second expedition to this desert region, which ended in 1900. "Tanami" was the original Aboriginal name for two rock caves with clear drinking water.

The Simpson Desert got its name from Allen Simpson, a geographer who ventured into this desert in 1845. The name was suggested by explorer and geologist Cecil Madigan. In 1936, Edmund Colson became the first white man to cross the Simpson Desert. Before that, the great Australian explorers Charles Sturt and David Lindsay had failed. While the early explorers used horses to cross the Outback, the first woman to make the journey riding a horse was Anna Hingley, who rode from Broome to Cairns in 2006. 
The nuclear weapons trials carried out by the United Kingdom at Maralinga and Emu Field in the 1950s and early 1960s have left areas contaminated with plutonium-239 and other radioactive material.

Regions 

A large contiguous desert area is formed by the Tanami, Greater Sands, Lesser Sands, Gibson and Greater Victoria Sands in western Australia and a smaller one by the Simpson, Sturt, Strzelecki and Tirari Deserts in the east. Spatially isolated between Great Victoria Sand and Simpson lies the small Pedirka Desert, which spreads out over the geological Pedirka Sedimentary Basin. The Small Sandy Desert connects to the Great Sandy Desert and is similar in terms of landscape and vegetation. The Western Desert, which describes a cultural region of Australia's indigenous people, includes the Gibson, Great Victoria, Great Sand and Small Sand deserts in the states of Northern Territory, South Australia and Western Australia.

Most of the inhabitants of the area are Indigenous Australians. There are other areas in Australia designated as desert that are not related to the Australian deserts mentioned above. On Kangaroo Island off the coast of South Australia is an area of two square kilometers called the Little Sahara, a formation of several sand dunes on its south coast. In Victoria, about 375 km west of Melbourne, there is still the Little Desert National Park. The Painted Desert is 121 kilometers northwest of Coober Pedy in South Australia.

The almost treeless Nullarbor Plain in southern Australia, made of limestone, are also known as the Nullarbor Desert.

Geography

There are four known types of terrestrial deserts:

 continental (or remote) deserts
 tropical (or zonal) deserts
 shelter deserts
 coastal deserts
Australian deserts generally meet the first three criteria, although some coastal desert areas exist in Western Australia. The great ocean circulation in the south of the continent and the cold sea currents in the southern zone play the fourth crucial role, indirectly at the origin of the long periods of continental drought by imposing high atmospheric pressures. As for the fifth hypothesis of cold or frozen deserts, as absurd as this assertion may appear in present-day Australia, they existed several million years ago. Geomorphologists thus explain a number of spectacular rock formations, from the Mount Olga or Uluru to the over-deepened wave of the wind rocks, by involving a thaw of (peri)glacial formations followed by wind action over a long period. The sand ridges have a trend of SSE-NNW and continue parallel for great distances.

Areas of the formerly desert outback, deserts such as the Simpson Desert from west to east or mountainous regions such as the Arckaringa Hills are characterized by ocean landscapes of charred rocks, called gibberss. As noted by early Australian explorers such as Ernest Giles large portions of the desert are characterized by gravel-covered terrains covered in thin desert grasses and it also contains extensive areas of undulating red sand plains and dunefields, low rocky/gravelly ridges and substantial upland portions with a high degree of laterite formation. The sandy soil of the lateritic buckshot plains is rich in iron in the Gibson Desert. Several isolated salt-water lakes occur in the centre of the region and to the southwest a system of small lakes follow paleo-drainage features. The desert proper is uninhabitable and the environment remains unmarred, while the greener fringe is used for sheep grazing.

Waterbodies

Lakes in the regions (most of which are dried up saline lakes), include:

Menindee Lakes
Willandra Lakes Region
Lake Mungo
Peery Lake
Lake Amadeus
Lake Mackay
Lake Neale
Numby Numby
Lake Sylvester
Tarrabool Lake
Lake Woods
Lake Yamma Yamma
Lake Bumbunga
Lake Dey Dey
Lake Dutton
Kati Thanda–Lake Eyre
Lake Frome
Lake Gairdner
Lake Gilles
Goyder Lagoon
Lake Gregory
Lake Hope
Sleaford Mere
Lake Torrens
Serpentine Lakes
Lake Maitland
Lake Carnegie
Lake Way
Lake Macleod
Lake Anneen
Lake Barlee
Lake Breaden
Lake Burnside
Lake Carey
Lake Dora
Dumbleyung Lake
Lake Nabberu
Serpentine Lakes
Kumpupintil Lake
Lake Ballard
Lake Lefroy
Lake Gregory

Rivers and creeks, which are sparse and generally ephemeral, in the Australian desert include:

Darling River
Alberga River
Finke River
Georgina River
Hale River
Alligator Rivers
Mary River
Todd River
Diamantina River
Gawler River
Macumba River
Warburton River
Fitzroy River
Leichhardt River

Biodiversity

Vegetation

Two types of semi-desert, referred to as "grassland" in Australia, occur in the Australian deserts: Tussock – or Mitchell grasslands are found in the desert areas of the Northern Territory, South Australia and western Queensland. The annual precipitation that falls on these marl and alluvial soils covered with grasses of the Astrebla genus ranges from 150 to 500 mm. Trees cannot take root on the heavy clay soils, and they are riddled with bushfires. Spinifex or hummock semi-desert grows spiny- headed grasses (Spinifex) in clumps, next to free areas as green Triodia pungens and blue-grey Triodia basedowii. Zygochloa dominates on the sand dunes of the Simpson, Strzelecki and Tirari deserts. In large areas of desert, semi-desert grasslands with mulga bushes (Acacia aneura) predominate.

Semi-desert savannas with low-growing acacia species cover large areas in the south of the arid zone, where 200 to 500 mm of precipitation falls in winter and summer. The acacia species, called mulga, grow on the plains, mountain slopes and hills of the deserts. In connection with the bushfires, which are mainly ignited by the spinifex grasses, the non-resistant mula bushes burn, which then no longer grow back. There is evidence that Aboriginal people did not start bushfires in mulga landscapes. The desert areas covered by mulga are also threatened by deforestation, extensive livestock farming and fuel wood production. At the eastern end of the arid zone is the so-called Witchetty Bush. This area is home to the endemic species of acacia, Acacia kempeana, which feeds the wood borer larva, the witchetty maggot, up to three inches in size. It is high in protein and was an important part of the Aboriginal diet.

Eucalyptus woodland thrives along the dry riverbeds. Grasses grow on the soil under the eucalypts. Chenopodiaceae shrubs, which usually do not exceed 1.5 meters in height, are found in the southern desert areas. They are salt plants that grow on both dry and saline soils. In the deserts there are permanent or percolating patches of freshwater formed in rocky areas or in sandstone canyons. Bluebush and saltbush species grow in heavier soils. Between the sand ridges, the areas of wooded steppe consist of Eucalyptus gongylocarpa, Eucalyptus youngiana, and Acacia aneura (mulga) shrubs scattered over areas of resilient spinifex grasses, particularly Triodia basedowii. Most of the area is covered by hummock grasslands (Triodia spp.), with a few eucalypts, acacias, grevilleas, and bloodwoods (Corymbia chippendalei and Corymbia opaca) are found on sand hills. The vegetation of the dunefields of the Tirari Desert is dominated by either Sandhill Wattle (Acacia ligulata) or Sandhill Cane-grass (Zygochloa paradoxa) which occur on the crests and slopes of dunes. Tall, open shrubland also occurs on the slopes.

In drier areas, species including Old Man Saltbush (Atriplex nummularia), Cottonbush (Maireana aphylla) and Queensland Bluebush (Chenopodium auricomum) form a sparse, open shrubland, whereas swamps and depressions are frequently associated with Swamp Cane-grass (Eragrostis australasica) and Lignum (Muehlenbeckia florulenta). The intermittent watercourses and permanent waterholes associated with tributaries of Cooper Creek support woodland dominated by River Red Gum (Eucalyptus camaldulensis) and Coolibah (Eucalyptus coolabah). Numerous salt lakes form after heavy rainfall and at times fill the underlying salt flats. The salt lakes occupy relatively small areas in the desert areas. For example, a major salt lake is Lake Eyre, which spans areas of the Gibson and Tirari deserts and fills up completely and then dries up about once every 25 years. Seventeen headwaters have formed in the deserts as a result of the subsurface Great Artesian Basin, one of the largest freshwater basins in the world. The water coming out of the springs is rich in minerals. The springs partially form the habitat of endemic fish and the spring area is overgrown with rare plants. Numerous springs have dried up due to extensive agricultural use in the last 100 years. Threats to biodiversity include wildfires, feral animals, weeds, and uncontrolled grazing.

Wildlife
Significantly fewer animals live in the Australian deserts than in the Australian coastal regions. The most common creatures in Australia's arid regions are insects, such as termites and ants, which are of great importance to the ecology. Animals in the desert include feral camels, dingoes, goannas (including the large perentie) and numerous species of lizards and birds. Mammals include bilbies, woma python, mulgara, malleefowl, common brushtail possum, rufous hare-wallaby, burrowing bettong, the black-flanked rock-wallaby, marsupial moles, rufous hare-wallabies, yellow-footed rock wallaby, western grey kangaroos, and red kangaroos. Some of the bird-life found within the desert include the rare Alexandra's parrot, wedge-tailed eagles, Australian bustard, the mulga parrot, the scarlet-chested parrot and the chestnut-breasted whiteface (Aphelocephala pectoralis) found on the eastern edge of the Great Victoria Desert and the malleefowl of Mamungari Conservation Park. 

About 103 species of mammals lived there at the time of European colonization, of which 19 are extinct, such as the desert bandicoot (Perameles eremiana), the numbat (Myrmecobius fasciatus) and the long-tailed bouncy mouse (Notomys longicaudatus). The main survivors are small rodents, insectivorous bats, marsupials, kangaroos and wallabies. A major threat to vegetation are the free-roaming camels in the desert. Over 300 species of birds live in the desert areas, including emus, ratites, parrots, cockatoos, owls and raptors. The desert includes many types of lizards, including the vulnerable great desert skink (Egernia kintorei), the Central Ranges taipan (discovered in 2007), and a number of small marsupials, including the endangered sandhill dunnart (Sminthopsis psammophila) and the crest-tailed mulgara (Dasycercus cristicauda). One way to survive here is to burrow into the sands, as a number of the desert's animals, including the southern marsupial mole (Notoryctes typhlops), and the water-holding frog do. 

Reptiles live in large numbers in the deserts, for example the thorny devils, bearded dragons,  monitor lizards, frilled dragon and geckos. Frog species that have adapted to drought, such as the Desert Trilling Frog (Neobatrachus centralis) and the Desert Tree Frog (Litoria rubella), can also occur. The most numerous species of lizards in the world can be found in the Australian desert, there are over 40 species of them there. In addition to fish, the few permanent freshwater holes are also home to mussels, crustaceans and insects. 34 species of fish occur in Lake Eyre and others at the artesian springs (e.g. at Dalhousie Springs in South Australia). Over 40 species of frogs have been observed after heavy rains.

The Dingo Fence was built to restrict movements of dingoes and wild dogs into agricultural areas towards the south east of the continent. Predators of the desert include the dingo (as the desert is north of the Dingo Fence) and two large monitor lizards, the perentie (Varanus giganteus) and the sand goanna (Varanus gouldii). Many introduced species have affected the fauna and flora of Australia's desert regions. The Australian feral camel affects native vegetation, partly because Australian desert vegetation evolved without any major herbivores present. Uncontrolled access to more sensitive areas by four-wheel-drive vehicles is also an issue. Feral cats have reduced the populations of bilbies and mulgara.

Climate

Australia's climate is mostly determined by the hot, sinking air of the subtropical high-pressure belt (i.e. Australian High). Dry conditions are associated with an El Niño–Southern Oscillation in Australia. Vegetation in arid areas is primarily dependent upon soil type. 

The average annual rainfall in the Australian desert ranges from 81 to 250 mm (3 to 10 in), which would make it a semi-arid climate. But a massive evaporation rate makes up for the higher than normal desert rainfall. Central Australia is arid, with the driest areas averaging  of rainfall each year. Thunderstorms are relatively common in the region, with an annual average of 15 to 20 thunderstorms. Summer daytime temperatures range from 32 to 40 °C (90 to 104 °F); winter maximum temperatures average between 18 to 23 °C (64 to 73 °F), though will be more warmer in the north.

Extensive areas are covered by longitudinal dunes. The northwestern region of the desert is one which gives rise to the heat lows which help drive the NW monsoon. There, almost all rain comes from monsoon thunderstorms or the occasional tropical cyclone rain depression. Frost does not occur in most of the area in the far north. The regions bordering the Gibson Desert in the far southeast may record a light frost or two every year, with frost being more prevalent in the Tanami region. Away from the coast winter nights can still be chilly in comparison to the warm days.

Tourism

Tourism is a major industry across the Great Australian desert, and commonwealth and state tourism agencies explicitly target Outback Australia as a sought after destination for domestic and international travelers. Tourism Australia explicitly markets nature-based and Indigenous-led experiences to tourists. In the 2015–2016 financial year, 815,000 visitors spent $988 million while on holidays in the Northern Territory alone. At Katjarra, there are two camping spots, with shed tanks and long-drop toilets, and Indigenous rangers are available to show tourists the part of the range that is open to the public. 

Riversleigh, in Queensland, is one of Australia's most renowned fossil sites and was recorded as a World Heritage site in 1994. The 100 km2 (39 sq mi) area contains fossil remains of ancient mammals, birds and reptiles of Oligocene and Miocene age.

There are several popular tourist attractions in the desert, which include:

 Arkaroola and Wilpena Pound in the Flinders Ranges
 Australian Stockman's Hall of Fame
 Devils Marbles
 Kakadu National Park
 Kata Tjuta (The Olgas)
 Katherine Gorge
 Kings Canyon (Watarrka)
 MacDonnell Ranges
 Monkey Mia
 Mount Augustus National Park
 Uluru (Ayers Rock)
 Willandra Lakes Region
 Lake Mungo
 Gawler Ranges National Park
 Gawler Ranges Conservation Park
 Great Victoria Desert Nature Reserve
 Lake Gairdner National Park
 Mamungari Conservation Park
 Munga-Thirri National Park
 Karlamilyi National Park
 Mount Willoughby Indigenous Protected Area
 Nullarbor Regional Reserve
 Pureba Conservation Park
 Queen Victoria Spring Nature Reserve
 Tallaringa Conservation Park	
 Watarru Indigenous Protected Area
 Yellabinna Regional Reserve
 Yellabinna Wilderness Protection Area
 Yumbarra Conservation Park
 Black Rock Conservation Park
 Bon Bon Station Conservation Reserve
 Bunkers Conservation Reserve
 Caroona Creek Conservation Park
 Coongie Lakes Ramsar Site
 Danggali Wilderness Protection Area
 Ediacara Conservation Park
 Elliot Price Conservation Park
 Gawler Ranges National Park
 Hiltaba Nature Reserve
 Ikara-Flinders Ranges National Park
 Ironstone Hill Conservation Park
 Kanku-Breakaways Conservation Park
 Kati Thanda-Lake Eyre National Park
 Kinchega National Park
 Lake Frome Regional Reserve
 Lake Gairdner National Park
 Lake Gilles Conservation Park
 Lake Torrens National Park
 Mount Brown Conservation Park
 Mount Willoughby Indigenous Protected Area
 Munyaroo Conservation Park
 Mutawintji National Park
 Nantawarrina Indigenous Protected Area
 Pandappa Conservation Park
 Pinkawillinie Conservation Park
 Pualco Range Conservation Park
 Simpson Desert Regional Reserve
 Strzelecki Regional Reserve
 Sturt National Park
 The Dutchmans Stern Conservation Park
 Vulkathunha-Gammon Ranges National Park
 Wabma Kadarbu Mound Springs Conservation Park
 Whyalla Conservation Park
 Winninowie Conservation Park
 Witchelina Nature Reserve
 Witjira National Park
 Yalpara Conservation Park
 Yellabinna Regional Reserve
 Yellabinna Wilderness Protection Area
 Yumbarra Conservation Park

Mining
Other than agriculture and tourism, the primary economic activity in the vast and sparsely settled desert is mining. Owing to the almost complete absence of mountain building and glaciation since the Permian (in many areas since the Cambrian) ages, the outback is extremely rich in iron, aluminum, manganese and uranium ores, and also contains major deposits of gold, nickel, copper, lead and zinc ores. Because of its size, the value of grazing and mining is considerable. Major mines and mining areas in the Outback include opals at Coober Pedy, Lightning Ridge and White Cliffs, metals at Broken Hill, Tennant Creek, Olympic Dam and the remote Challenger Mine. Oil and gas are extracted in the Cooper Basin around Moomba. The Tanami Desert features The Granites gold mine and Coyote Gold Mine.

In Western Australia the Argyle diamond mine in the Kimberley is the world's biggest producer of natural diamonds and contributes approximately one-third of the world's natural supply. The Pilbara region's economy is dominated by mining and petroleum industries. Most of Australia's iron ore is also mined in the Pilbara and it also has one of the world's major manganese mines.

Transport

The outback is reticulated by historic tracks with excellent bitumen surface and well-maintained dirt roads. The Stuart Highway runs from north to south through the centre of the continent, roughly paralleled by the Tarcoola-Darwin railway line. There is a proposal to develop some of the roads running from the south-west to the north-east to create an all-weather road named the Outback Highway, crossing the continent diagonally from Laverton, Western Australia (north of Kalgoorlie), through the Northern Territory to Winton, in Queensland. Air transport is relied on for mail delivery in some areas, owing to sparse settlement and wet-season road closures. Most outback mines have an airstrip and many have a fly-in fly-out workforce.

Roads in the desert include:

 Birdsville Track
 Burke Developmental Road
 Canning Stock Route
 Colson Track
 Connie Sue Highway
 French Line
 Gary Highway
 Gibb River Road
 Great Central Road
 Gunbarrel Highway
 Kalumburu Road
 Kidman Way
 Lasseter Highway
 Oodnadatta Track
 Peninsula Developmental Road
 Plenty Highway
 Sandover Highway
 Strzelecki Track
 Talawana Track
 Tanami Track

Towns
Although the desert covers about three-quarters of the continent, it only supports around 800,000 residents – less than 5% of the Australian population. In addition, there are approximately 1,200 small Indigenous communities, of which almost half have a population of fewer than 100 people. The Royal Flying Doctor Service (RFDS) started service in 1928 and helps people who live in the outback of Australia. In former times, serious injuries or illnesses often meant death due to the lack of proper medical facilities and trained personnel. Young Indigenous adults from the Gibson Desert region work in the Wilurarra Creative programs to maintain and develop their culture. Indigenous Australians in the desert regions include the Kogara, the Mirning and the Pitjantjatjara. Aboriginal populations have been increasing in this region. 

Inhabited areas within the Great Australian desert include many towns and as well as some cities, such as:
Northern Territory

Yulara
Alice Springs
Elliot
Tennant Creek

New South Wales/Victoria

Broken Hill
Cobar
Wilcannia
Bourke
Mildura
Wentworth
Tibooburra

Western Australia

Dampier
Kalgoorlie
Wiluna
Carnarvon
Karratha
Paraburdoo
Port Hedland
Halls Creek
Fitzroy Crossing
Newman
Exmouth
Meekatharra
Eucla
Wyndham

Queensland

Mount Isa
Cloncurry
Cunnamulla
Longreach

South Australia

Whyalla
Coober Pedy
Ceduna
Renmark
Port Augusta
Port Pirie
Oodnadatta
Roxby Downs
Andamooka

Languages and people

The Aboriginal languages with the most speakers today in the desert include Upper Arrernte, Walmajarri, Warlpiri, and the Western Desert languages within the Western Desert cultural bloc, such as the Wati languages, the Panyjima language, Wangkatha, Noongar language, the Yankunytjatjara dialect and the Pitjantjatjara dialect. There is also the Adnyamathanha language in South Australia. Other (extant) language clusters include the Kalkatungic languages, Ngarna languages Arandic languages, Ngumpin–Yapa languages, Warumungu languages, Ngayarda languages, Kanyara-Mantharta languages and Thura-Yura languages. Most of these languages belong in the Pama–Nyungan language family.

Ethnic groups include the Kartudjara, Warumungu people, Pitjantjatjara, Panyjima people, Kuyani, Yankunytjatjara, Kunapa, Manjiljarra, Ayerrereng, Yuruwinga, Yulparija and the Maduwongga.

Popular culture
Popular movies set or filmed in the Australian desert include:

Kangaroo (1952)
Wake in Fright (1971)
Walkabout (1971)
Mad Max (1979)
The Road Warrior (1981)
Mad Max Beyond Thunderdome (1985)
Crocodile Dundee (1986)
Crocodile Dundee II (1988)
Evil Angels (1988)
Quigley Down Under (1990)
The Rescuers Down Under (1990)
The Adventures of Priscilla, Queen of the Desert (1994)
Napoleon (1995)
Welcome to Woop Woop (1997)
Rabbit-Proof Fence (2002)
The Tracker (2002)
Kangaroo Jack (2003)
Wolf Creek (2005)
The Proposition (2005)
Rogue (2007)
Australia (2008)
Bran Nue Dae (2009)
Last Ride (2009)
Samson and Delilah (2009)
Red Dog (2012)
Satellite Boy (2012)
Blinky Bill the Movie (2015)
Sweet Country (2017)
Bilby (2018)
High Ground (2020)

See also

 Bushland
 Irrigation in Australia
 Outback
 The bush

References

Further reading
 Johnson, John & Catherine de Courcy.(1998) Desert Tracks Port Melbourne, Vic. Lothian Books.

External links

 The Australian Landscape, A Cultural History – A four-part program exploring the way Europeans and Aboriginal people have engaged with the desert, through art, science and religion, from ABC Radio National
 Encarta (Archived 2009-10-31)
 World Book
 

 
Rural geography
Regions of Australia
Australian outback
Deserts and xeric shrublands
Physiographic provinces
Geography of Australia
Biogeography of Australia
Vegetation of Australia